Phoebe Mary Waller-Bridge (born 14 July 1985) is an English actress and screenwriter. She is best known as the creator, head writer, and star of the BBC sitcom Fleabag (2016–2019), which was based on her one-woman show of the same name. She was also showrunner, head writer, and executive producer of the first season of Killing Eve (2018–2022), which she adapted for television.

For Fleabag, Waller-Bridge received the British Academy Television Award for Best Female Comedy Performance, three Emmy Awards (Outstanding Lead Actress in a Comedy Series, Outstanding Writing for a Comedy Series, and Outstanding Comedy Series), and two Golden Globe Awards (Best Actress – Television Series Musical or Comedy and Best Television Series – Musical or Comedy).

Waller-Bridge also created, wrote, and starred in the Channel 4 comedy series Crashing (2016). She appeared in the comedy series The Café (2011–2013) and the second season of Broadchurch (2015). She has appeared in films such as Albert Nobbs (2011), The Iron Lady (2011), Goodbye Christopher Robin (2017), and as the droid L3-37 in the Star Wars film Solo: A Star Wars Story (2018). She also contributed to the screenplay of the James Bond film No Time to Die (2021).

Early life 
Phoebe Mary Waller-Bridge was born in Hammersmith, London, on 14 July 1985, the daughter of Michael Cyprian Waller-Bridge, founder of the electronic trading platform Tradepoint, and Theresa Mary, daughter of Sir John Edward Longueville Clerke, 12th Baronet, employed by the Worshipful Company of Ironmongers. The Bridge, later Waller-Bridge, family were soldiers and clergymen, who came to rank among the landed gentry of Cuckfield in Sussex. Her grandfather, Cyprian Waller-Bridge (1918-1960), "a Wodehousian sort of character... 'the eccentric son of an eccentric vicar'", was an actor and BBC announcer. On her father's side, she is a descendant of the Revd Sir Egerton Leigh, 2nd Baronet, and a distant relative of politician and author Egerton Leigh, Conservative MP for Mid Cheshire from 1873 to his death in 1876.

Waller-Bridge grew up in London's Ealing district, and has two siblings: an older sister named Isobel Waller-Bridge, a composer with whom she has collaborated, and a younger brother named Jasper Waller-Bridge. Her parents are divorced. She was educated at St Augustine's Priory, a Catholic independent school for girls, followed by the independent sixth form college DLD College London in the Marylebone area of London. She graduated from the Royal Academy of Dramatic Art in London.

Career

Early work and breakthrough (2007–2015) 

Waller-Bridge's performing credits begin in theatre in 2007. At that time, she co-founded the DryWrite Theatre Company with Vicky Jones. They are co-artistic directors of the company. The two women met and became friends while working on theatre productions. Among her acting theatre credits are the 2009 productions Roaring Trade at Soho Theatre and Rope at the Almeida Theatre. She performed in a production of Noël Coward's Hay Fever in 2011 and Mydidae in 2012. Waller-Bridge then wrote and starred in Fleabag, which she first performed as part of the London Storytelling Festival on 25 November 2012. The first full version of Fleabag premiered at the Edinburgh Fringe Festival in 2013. She later wrote the short plays production Good. Clean. Fun. Waller-Bridge returned to the stage for further productions of Fleabag between 2013 and 2019.

Waller-Bridge began her screen career in 2009, playing roles in short films and in individual episodes of television sitcoms and dramas. Her early television appearances include the 2011 film The Night Watch, as well as Bad Education and Coming Up in 2013 and Blandings in 2014. She had supporting roles in The Café from 2011 to 2013 and in the second season of the crime drama series Broadchurch in 2015. Her first feature length theatrical film roles were in 2011 for Albert Nobbs and The Iron Lady. Her role in Albert Nobbs had her cast alongside Emerald Fennell, to whom she would later hand off showrunner duties for Killing Eve.

Waller-Bridge has voice acted for several BBC Radio plays, such as 2013's Vincent Price and the Horror of the English Blood Beast, in which she played actress Hillary Dwyer, and a 2014 adaptation of an Agatha Christie story. She has provided narration in short films, including a 2015 television documentary on dating apps and a 2016 Christmas themed animated short film. She has also voiced ads for companies such as The Cotswold Company, Warburtons, Gordon's Gin, Trainline, Travel Republic, Kuoni Travel, and Tropicana.

Critical acclaim and wider recognition (2016–present) 
In 2016, she wrote and starred in her first television project, the Channel 4 comedy Crashing about a group of twenty-somethings living in an abandoned hospital under the property guardianship scheme. It began streaming on Netflix after airing in the UK, with W Magazine calling it Waller-Bridge's "twisted take on Friends." GQ Magazine described the show's six episodes as: "perfect little whirlwinds of comedy building to one big maelstrom where everyone falls to pieces—some are better off for it, and some are not. No matter where the chips fall, you'll have a good time."

After an initial release on BBC Three, Fleabag was broadcast on BBC Two from August 2016. It was picked up by the on-demand Amazon Video service and premiered in the United States in September 2016. For her performance in the series she won the British Academy Television Award for Best Female Comedy Performance and was nominated for a Critics' Choice Television Award for Best Actress in a Comedy Series. Fleabags second and final series aired in 2019. For the second series, Waller-Bridge received Primetime Emmy Awards for Outstanding Lead Actress in a Comedy Series, Outstanding Writing for a Comedy Series, and Outstanding Comedy Series.

She voiced and performed droid L3-37 in the Star Wars film Solo: A Star Wars Story (2018). Waller-Bridge wrote and produced the thriller television series Killing Eve, based on novels by Luke Jennings. She was also the showrunner for season 1. The BBC America series stars Sandra Oh and Jodie Comer and premiered in April 2018 to critical acclaim. For her work on the series, she received nominations for the Primetime Emmy Award for Outstanding Writing for a Drama Series and Outstanding Drama Series, the latter as a producer.

In March 2019, HBO ordered the series Run, with Waller-Bridge as executive producer. In the series, she also portrayed the recurring character Laurel. It was cancelled after one season. In 2019, Waller-Bridge co-wrote the screenplay for No Time to Die (2021), the 25th James Bond film, along with Neal Purvis, Robert Wade and Cary Joji Fukunaga. It was stated she was brought on to introduce "more humour and the offbeat style of writing she is best known for." In 2020, Waller-Bridge voiced Sayan Kötör in season 2 of the television show His Dark Materials. She also directed the music video for "Savior Complex" by Phoebe Bridgers. Waller-Bridge then appeared in the music video for "Treat People with Kindness" by Harry Styles, which premiered on 1 January 2021.

She was set to co-star with Donald Glover in a television adaptation of the 2005 film Mr. and Mrs. Smith, but in September 2021, it was revealed that Waller-Bridge had exited the series over creative differences. Waller-Bridge is developing a Tomb Raider TV series for Amazon Prime. She appears in Indiana Jones and the Dial of Destiny, which is to be released in 2023.

Personal life
Waller-Bridge lives in the Shoreditch area of London. She married Irish presenter and documentary filmmaker Conor Woodman in 2014. By 2017, they had separated and filed for divorce. Since early 2018, she has been in a relationship with playwright Martin McDonagh.

Waller-Bridge describes herself as an atheist, although she says she "hopped around a bit from religion to religion" while growing up. She avoids social media, stating in a 2019 interview that she "would feel pressure to be funny the whole time" and that she did not feel confident enough to deal with the negative comments that come with social media use.

Filmography

Film

Television

Theatre

Music videos

Radio

Publications

Awards and honours

See also
List of British actors

References

External links 

 

1985 births
Living people
Showrunners
Television show creators
English television writers
British women television writers
British television producers
British women television producers
21st-century English actresses
21st-century atheists
Actresses from London
English atheists
English dramatists and playwrights
English film actresses
English stage actresses
English television actresses
English theatre directors
English voice actresses
Best Female Comedy Performance BAFTA Award (television) winners
Best Musical or Comedy Actress Golden Globe (television) winners
Outstanding Performance by a Lead Actress in a Comedy Series Primetime Emmy Award winners
Primetime Emmy Award winners
People educated at St Augustine's Priory School, Ealing
Theatre World Award winners
Outstanding Performance by a Female Actor in a Comedy Series Screen Actors Guild Award winners
Phoebe